The list of Olympic men's ice hockey players for Czechoslovakia consisted of 160 skaters and 21 goaltenders. Men's ice hockey tournaments have been staged at the Olympic Games since 1920 (it was introduced at the 1920 Summer Olympics, and was permanently added to the Winter Olympic Games in 1924). Czechoslovakia participated in sixteen tournaments, the first in 1920 and the last in 1992, only missing the 1932 Winter Olympics during the country's existence. The country split after that into the Czech Republic and Slovakia, with the Czech and Slovak national teams participating in every Olympics since then. Czechoslovakia won four silver and four bronze medals.

Three players — Vlastimil Bubník, Josef Černý, and Jiří Holík — have played in four separate Olympics, while Bubník played in the most games, 30. Vladimír Zábrodský scored the most goals, 23, while Černý had the most assists, 17, and tied with Jozef Golonka for the most points, 29. Three players, Dominik Hašek, Václav Nedomanský, and Peter Šťastný, have been inducted into the Hockey Hall of Fame, while 24 players have been inducted into the International Ice Hockey Federation Hall of Fame, though Ján Starší was inducted as a builder.



Key

Goaltenders

Skaters

References

Notes

Citations

References

 
 
 
 
 
 

Czechoslovakia men's national ice hockey team
Ice hockey
Lists of Slovak sportspeople
Czechoslovakia
Czechoslovakia